The 49th Air Transport Squadron is an inactive United States Air Force unit. Its last assignment was as part of the 1502d Air Transport Wing, Military Air Transport Service, stationed at Hickam Air Force Base, Hawaii. It was inactivated on 1 July 1955.

History
Activated as a ferrying unit during World War II, it served in the Mediterranean Theater of Operations until disbanded in 1943 and replaced by Station 10, North African Wing, Air Transport Command.

Reestablished in 1952 to replace the 1265th Air Transport Squadron, which had been organized on 1 June 1949 as a medium transport squadron flying Douglas C-54 Skymasters, it transported supplies and personnel in the Pacific from Hawaii to the Philippines and bases in between. It deployed elements of the squadron to Tachikawa Air Base, Japan during 1951–1952, flying combat resupply missions during the Korean War.

After the Korean War, it returned to normal peacetime operations. It was inactivated simultaneously with the host 1500th ATW in July 1955.

Lineage
 Constituted as the 49th Ferrying Squadron
 Activated c. 9 July 1942
 Redesignated 49th Transport Squadron, c. 29 March 1943
 Disbanded on 20 September 1943
 Reconstituted as the 49th Air Transport Squadron, Medium on 20 June 1952
 Activated on 20 July 1952
 Inactivated on 1 July 1955

Assignments
 14th Ferrying Group, c. 9 July 1942
 African-Middle East Wing, Air Transport Command, 1943 – 20 September 1943
 1500th Air Transport Group, 20 July 1952 - 1 July 1955

Stations
 Bathurst, Gambia, c. 9 July 1942
 Marrakech, French Morocco, c. February 1943 – 20 September 1943
 Hickam Air Force Base Hawaii, 20 July 1952 - 1 July 1955

Aircraft
 C-54 Skymaster, 1949-1952
 C-97 Stratofreighter, 1952-1955

References

 Mueller, Robert, Air Force Bases Volume I, Active Air Force Bases Within the United States of America on 17 September 1982, Office of Air Force History, 1989

0049
Military units and formations in Hawaii
Military units and formations established in 1952